North Toledo Bend State Park is one of two Louisiana State Parks located on the shores of Toledo Bend Reservoir. Hwy. 3229.

Activities
Like most Louisiana state parks, entrance fees are $3 per person. Boating is especially popular on Toledo Bend and guests often use a boat launch where paddleboats or canoes may be rented to fish in the nationally acclaimed reservoir. Fisherman may use a fish cleaning station on site.

There are 10 cabins and 67 campsites on the Park grounds for campers. Hikers is promoted at the park via two trails.

The park's visitor center complex contains a large meeting room which can be reserved for group functions and an Olympic-size swimming pool.

There is a group camp available with 5 dorms that sleep 50 people each in bunk beds. It includes a full-size cafeteria-style kitchen with an industrial size oven, refrigerator, cooking implements, and serving line.

A bath house and restroom facilities are located centrally in the group camp, which also features a fishing pier.

See also
South Toledo Bend State Park

References

External links

North Toledo Bend State Park - Louisiana Office of State Parks
North Toledo Bend State Park

State parks of Louisiana
Protected areas of Sabine Parish, Louisiana